Tijat is an uninhabited Croatian island in the Adriatic Sea located southwest of Vodice and west of Prvić.

The land is mostly owned by people of Šepurina from island Prvić.

Tijašćica bay is located on the southeast part of the island, exposed to the jugo wind and sheltered from other winds. There is a restaurant in the bay.

References

Islands of the Adriatic Sea
Uninhabited islands of Croatia
Landforms of Šibenik-Knin County